Oh Yong-Ran (born 6 September 1972), also spelled as Oh Yeong-Ran, is a South Korean handball player who competed in the 1996, 2000, and 2004 Summer Olympics.

In 1996, she was part of the South Korean national team, which won the silver medal. She played four matches, including the final, as goalkeeper.

Four years later Oh was part of the South Korean team which finished fourth in the 2000 Olympic tournament. She played all seven matches as goalkeeper.

In 2004, she won the silver medal with the South Korean team again. She played all seven matches as goalkeeper.

She is married to handballer Kang Il-koo.

References

External links
Profile at databaseolympics.com (archived)

1972 births
Living people
South Korean female handball players
Olympic handball players of South Korea
Handball players at the 1996 Summer Olympics
Handball players at the 2000 Summer Olympics
Handball players at the 2004 Summer Olympics
Handball players at the 2008 Summer Olympics
Handball players at the 2016 Summer Olympics
Olympic silver medalists for South Korea
Olympic bronze medalists for South Korea
Olympic medalists in handball
Medalists at the 2008 Summer Olympics
Asian Games medalists in handball
Handball players at the 1994 Asian Games
Handball players at the 1998 Asian Games
Medalists at the 2004 Summer Olympics
Medalists at the 1996 Summer Olympics
Asian Games gold medalists for South Korea
Medalists at the 1994 Asian Games
Medalists at the 1998 Asian Games
20th-century South Korean women
21st-century South Korean women